Klipberg Dam is an arch type dam located on the Konings River, near McGregor, Western Cape, South Africa. It was established in 1964 and its main purpose is to serve for irrigation. It is located in the Breede Water Management Area.

See also
List of reservoirs and dams in South Africa
List of rivers of South Africa

References 

 List of South African Dams from the Department of Water Affairs

Dams in South Africa
Dams completed in 1964